Soul Survivor II is a studio album by hip hop producer Pete Rock, released in 2004. The album features guest appearances from a large number of hip hop artists, including Pharoahe Monch, Little Brother, RZA, GZA, Talib Kweli, Dead Prez, and former partner CL Smooth.

Pete, who dropped verses on the majority of the songs found on his solo debut Soul Survivor, performs only a single verse on this album ("Niggas Know") but handles several choruses throughout. Rock's engineer, Jamey Staub, co-produces a number of songs on the project.

The album's front cover is a nod to the Miles Davis album Tutu, which features the jazz trumpeter in an identical, albeit black and white, portrait shot.

Critical reception
RapReviews wrote that "Rock lets us know that he hasn’t lost a step as far as beats go, displaying an uncanny ability of picking the perfect artist for nearly each song on the disc." The A.V. Club wrote that Rock "ill-advisedly strays from his lush, mellow chill-out sound on a handful of tracks."

Track listing
All tracks produced by Pete Rock

Samples
Truth Is
"Girl You Move Me" by Cane and Able
We Good
"Mango Meat" by Mandrill
Give It to Ya
"Running" by Baby Huey
"I Believe in You" by The Moments
"The Makings of You" by Gladys Knight & the Pips
It's a Love Thing
"Try Love Again" by The Natural Four
One MC One DJ
"Gotta Get Away" by Flaming Ember
Beef
"The Stunt Man – Main Theme" by Dominic Frontiere
"Where Do I Go From Here (Sonny Carson's Theme)" by Coleridge-Taylor Perkinson 
No Tears
"The Junkies" by Coleridge-Taylor Perkinson
Head Rush
"What Happened to the Real Me" by Mavis Staples
Da Villa
"Holding on to a Dying Love" by Otis Clay
Niggaz Know
"Heartbeat" by War
Appreciate
"2-4-6-8" by The Jackson 5

Album singles

Charts

References

2004 albums
Pete Rock albums
Albums produced by Pete Rock
Sequel albums
Barely Breaking Even albums